The Bloomington, Indiana, Metropolitan Statistical Area, as defined by the United States Census Bureau, is an area comprising three counties (Monroe, Greene and Owen) in south-central Indiana. The city of Bloomington in Monroe County is the area's principal municipality and its anchor. At the 2010 United States census, the MSA had a population of 192,714.

Counties
Greene
Monroe
Owen

Communities

Places with more than 50,000 inhabitants
Bloomington (pop 84,465)

Places with 5,000 to 10,000 inhabitants
Ellettsville
Linton

Places with 1,000 to 5,000 inhabitants
Bloomfield
Jasonville
Spencer
Worthington

Places with less than 1,000 inhabitants
Gosport
Lyons
Newberry
Stinesville
Switz City

Unincorporated places

Townships

Greene County

Monroe County

Owen County

Demographics
As of the census of 2000, there were 175,506 people, 68,552 households, and 40,269 families residing within the MSA. The racial makeup of the MSA was 93.22% White, 2.11% African American, 0.29% Native American, 2.38% Asian, 0.04% Pacific Islander, 0.64% from other races, and 1.34% from two or more races. Hispanic or Latino of any race were 1.52% of the population.

The median income for a household in the MSA was $34,613, and the median income for a family was $44,621. Males had a median income of $32,794 versus $23,202 for females. The per capita income for the MSA was $17,417.

See also
Indiana census statistical areas

References

 
Monroe County, Indiana
Owen County, Indiana